–

The 2022–23 Mountain West Conference men's basketball season began with practices in October followed by the 2022–23 NCAA Division I men's basketball season which started on November 7, 2022. Conference play will begin in December 2022.

The Mountain West tournament will take place in March 2023 at the Thomas & Mack Center in Las Vegas, Nevada.

Pre-season

Recruiting classes

Preseason watchlists
Below is a table of notable preseason watch lists.

Preseason All-American teams

Preseason polls

Mountain West Media days
The Mountain West will conduct its 2022 Mountain West media days on October 20, 2022.

The teams and representatives in respective order were as follows:

 Mountain West Commissioner – Craig Thompson
 Air Force – Joe Scott (HC)
 Boise State – Leon Rice (HC)
 Colorado State – Niko Medved (HC)
 Fresno State – Justin Hutson (HC)
 Nevada – Steve Alford (HC)
 New Mexico – Richard Pitino (HC)
 San Diego State – Brian Dutcher (HC 
 San Jose State – Tim Miles (HC)
 UNLV – Kevin Kruger (HC)
 Utah State – Ryan Odom (HC)
 Wyoming – Jeff Linder (HC)

Source:

Mountain West Preseason All-Conference

First Team

Midseason watchlists
Below is a table of notable midseason watch lists.

Final watchlists
Below is a table of notable year end watch lists.

Regular season
The Schedule will be released in late October. All regular season conference games and conference tournament games would be broadcast nationally by ESPN Inc. family of networks including ABC, ESPN, ESPN2 and ESPNU, FOX, FS1, CBS Sports, AltitudeTV, AT&T Sports Network, Cowboy Sports Network, Evoca, FloSports, NBC Bay Area, Nevada Sports Network, Mountain West Network, Pac-12 Network, SEC Network, WCC Network, YouTube Live and YurView

Early season tournaments

Records against other conferences
Records against non-conference foes for the 2022–23 season. Records shown for regular season only.

Regular Season

Postseason

Record against ranked non-conference opponents
This is a list of games against ranked opponents only (rankings from the AP Poll):

Team rankings are reflective of AP poll when the game was played, not current or final ranking

Conference schedule
This table summarizes the head-to-head results between teams in conference play.

Points scored

Through March 5, 2023

Rankings

NVHead coaches

Coaching changes

Coaches
Note: Stats shown are before the beginning of the season. Mountain West records are from time at current school.

Notes:
 Mountain West records, conference titles, etc. are from time at current school and are through the end the 2021–22 season.
 NCAA tournament appearances are from time at current school only.
 NCAA Final Fours and Championship include time at other schools.

Post season

Mountain West tournament

The conference tournament will be played in March 8−11, 2023 at the Thomas & Mack Center in Las Vegas, NV. The top five teams will have a bye on the first day. Teams will be seeded by conference record, with ties broken by record between the tied teams followed by record against the regular-season champion, if necessary.

NCAA tournament

Teams from the conference that will be selected to participate:

National Invitation Tournament 
Members from the conference that will be selected to participate:

Awards and honors

Players of the Week 
Throughout the regular season, the Mountain West offices will honor 2 players based on performance by naming them player of the week and freshman of the week.

Totals per School

All-Americans

All-District
The United States Basketball Writers Association (USBWA) named the following from the Mountain West to their All-District Teams:

District VIII

All-District Team

District IX
Player of the Year

All-District Team

Mountain West season awards
The Mountain West presents two separate sets of major awards—one voted on by conference coaches and the other by media.

All-Pac-12

First Team

 ‡ Mountain West Player of the Year
 ††† three-time All-Mountain West First Team honoree
 †† two-time All-Mountain West First Team honoree
 † two-time All-Mountain West honoree

Second Team

Third Team

Honorable Mention

All-Freshman Team

† Mountain West Player of the Year
‡ Mountain West Freshman of the Year
Honorable Mention

All-Defensive Team

† Mountain West Player of the Year
‡ Mountain West Defensive Player of the Year
†† two-time Mountain West All-Defensive Team honoree
Honorable Mention

Scholar Athlete of the year

All-Mountain West tournament team

National awards

2022–23 Season statistic leaders
Source:

2023 NBA draft

Home game attendance 

Bold – At or exceed capacity
†Season high

References

Mountain West Conference basketball